Oscar O'Shea (8 October 1881 – 6 April 1960) was a Canadian-American character actor with over 100 film appearances from 1937 to 1953.

Early years
O'Shea was born in Peterborough, Ontario, Canada.

Acting
O'Shea was a comic actor who earned a million dollars but lost it all in the Great Depression. His first straight role came in a Federal Theatre Project production of It Can't Happen Here, a play based on the novel of the same name.

O'Shea's first film was Captains Courageous (1937).

Management
Beginning in 1929, O'Shea operated the Oscar O'Shea Players repertory theater company in the Embassy Theatre in Ottawa, Canada. He eventually ended the enterprise "to seek a field where his art would be more widely appreciated." He then set up an operation in Chicago, "where he managed his own theatre and stock company during good and bad years."

Death
O'Shea died in Hollywood, California, in 1960 at age 78.

Selected filmography

 The Good Old Soak (1937) as Jake (uncredited)
 Captains Courageous (1937) as Captain Walt Cushman
 Big City (1937) as John C. Andrews
 Double Wedding (1937) as Turnkey (uncredited)
 Thoroughbreds Don't Cry (1937) as Man Seated Next to Wilkins (uncredited)
 You're Only Young Once (1937) as Sheriff (uncredited)
 Mannequin (1937) as 'Pa' Cassidy
 Rosalie (1937) as Mr. Callahan
 Man-Proof (1938) as Gus
 Love Is a Headache (1938) as Pop Sheeman, Stage Doorman (uncredited)
 Border Wolves (1938) as Judge Coleman
 King of the Newsboys (1938) as Mr. Stephens
 International Crime (1938) as Heath
 Hold That Kiss (1938) as Pop, Man Bringing Usher's Clothes (uncredited)
 Numbered Woman (1938)
 The Main Event (1938) as Captain Rorty
 Rebellious Daughters (1938) as Dad Elliott
 Racket Busters (1938) as Pop Wilson
 Youth Takes a Fling (1938) as Captain Walters
 Stablemates (1938) as Pete Whalen
 The Shining Hour (1938) as Charlie Collins
 Angels with Dirty Faces (1938) as Kennedy (uncredited)
 King of the Turf (1939) as Bartender
 Love Affair (1939) as Priest (uncredited)
 Undercover Agent (1939) as Pat Murphy
 Big Town Czar (1939) as Pa Daley
 Lucky Night (1939) as Police Lieutenant
 Tell No Tales (1939) as Sam O'Neil
 S.O.S. Tidal Wave (1939) as Mike Halloran
 Invitation to Happiness (1939) as Divorce Judge
 She Married a Cop (1939) as Pa Duffy
 The Star Maker (1939) as Mr. Flannigan
 Those High Grey Walls (1939) as Warden
 The Roaring Twenties (1939) as Customer (uncredited)
 Missing Evidence (1939) as John C. 'Pop' Andrews
 The Night of Nights (1939) as Mr. Conway (uncredited)
 Of Mice and Men (1939) as Jackson
 I Take This Woman (1940) as Dowling (scenes deleted)
 Zanzibar (1940) as Captain Craig
 Forty Little Mothers (1940) as Janitor at Train Station (uncredited)
 20 Mule Team (1940) as Train Conductor
 You Can't Fool Your Wife (1940) as Dr. Emery, Colony College Chaplain
 Susan and God (1940) as Samr (uncredited)
 Pier 13 (1940) as Skipper Kelly
 Stranger on the Third Floor (1940) as The Judge
 Wildcat Bus (1940) as Charles Dawson
 The Bride Wore Crutches (1940) as Pop (uncredited)
 Always a Bride (1940) as Uncle Dan Jarvis
 The Phantom Submarine (1940) as Captain Velsar
 Four Mothers (1941) as George Edwards (uncredited)
 Sleepers West (1941) as Engineer McGowan
 Mutiny in the Arctic (1941) as Capt. Bob Morrissey
 Blossoms in the Dust (1941) as Dr. West (uncredited)
 Accent on Love (1941) as Magistrate
 Ringside Maisie (1941) as Conductor
 Harmon of Michigan (1941) as 'Pop' Branch
 Lydia (1941) as Doctor Richards (uncredited)
 Riders of the Purple Sage (1941) as Noah Judkins
 The Officer and the Lady (1941) as Dan Regan
 Fly-by-Night (1942) as Pa Prescott
 Torpedo Boat (1942) as Captain Mike
 The Bashful Bachelor (1942) as Squire Skimp
 I Was Framed (1942) as Cal Beamish
 The Postman Didn't Ring (1942) as Judge Barrington
 Just Off Broadway (1942) as Pop
 Halfway to Shanghai (1942) as Doctor McIntyre
 Sin Town (1942) as Train Conductor (uncredited)
 Henry Aldrich, Editor (1942) as Judge Sanders
 Lady Bodyguard (1943) as Justice of the Peace (uncredited)
 City Without Men (1943) as Joseph Barton
 Two Weeks to Live (1943) as Squire Skimp (uncredited)
 Good Morning, Judge (1943) as Magistrate
 Three Hearts for Julia (1943) as Stage Doorman (uncredited)
 Two Tickets to London (1943) as Mr. Tinkle
 Gals, Incorporated (1943) as Justice (uncredited)
 The Good Fellows (1943) as Great Grand Caesar (uncredited)
 Corvette K-225 (1943) as Capt. Smith (uncredited)
 Happy Land (1943) as Father Case (uncredited)
 Her Primitive Man (1944) as Jonathan
 South of Dixie (1944) as Col. Hatcher
 The Mummy's Ghost (1944) as Watchman
 Haunted Harbor (1944, Serial) as John Galbraith [Chs. 1, 7, 15]
 Mystery of the River Boat (1944, Serial) as Capt. Ethan Perrin
 Here Come the Waves (1944) as Commodore (uncredited)
 Bewitched (1945) as Capt. O'Malley
 Senorita from the West (1945) as Dusty
 Without Reservations (1946) as Conductor (uncredited)
 Personality Kid (1946) as Officer O'Brien
 The Brute Man (1946) as Mr. Haskins, Grocer (uncredited)
 Abie's Irish Rose (1946) as Bishop (uncredited)
 Stallion Road (1947) as Doc Brady, DVM (uncredited)
 Sport of Kings (1947) as Judge Sellers
 Where There's Life (1947) as Uncle Philip (uncredited)
 It Had to Be You (1947) as Irish Neighborhood Watchman (scenes deleted)
 My Wild Irish Rose (1947) as Pat Daly
 Fury at Furnace Creek (1948) as Jailer (uncredited)
 One Sunday Afternoon (1948) as Toby
 The Daughter of Rosie O'Grady (1950) as Mr. Flannigan (uncredited)
 Thy Neighbor's Wife (1953) (final film role)

References

External links

1881 births
1960 deaths
20th-century Canadian male actors
Canadian emigrants to the United States
Canadian male film actors
Male actors from Ontario
People from Peterborough, Ontario